Greatest Hits is a collection of songs recorded by Freda Payne for the label of Invictus Records. Like many collections of Payne's music, it begins with her biggest hit "Band of Gold." It contains all eight singles from that label, along with four album tracks. It mistakenly says that the ninth track is "I'm Not Getting Any Better," as it is actually two songs put together: "I'm Not Getting Any Better" and "Suddenly It's Yesterday." Both of these songs were written by Brian Holland and Lamont Dozier. Inside the album cover are liner notes from Eddie Holland along with a brief history of Freda Payne's life and career that mainly focuses on her career with Invictus Records.

Track listing

Album credits
Project producer: Richard J. Davis
Executive producer: Eddie Holland
Compiled by: Rodney J. Brown
Digital transfers: L.T. Horn for Supertec
Preproduction: Rodney J. Brown
Project coordinator: Victoria J. Canchola
Digital mastering: Joe Tarantino (Fantasy Studios, Berkeley, CA)

1991 compilation albums
Freda Payne albums